Chow Kit Monorail station is a Malaysian elevated monorail train station that serves as a part of the Kuala Lumpur Monorail (KL Monorail), located in Kuala Lumpur and opened alongside the rest of the train service on August 31, 2003.

The station, the second last KL Monorail station before the Titiwangsa terminal station, is located and named after the district of Chow Kit, over the meeting point of the southern ends of Jalan Pahang and Jalan Ipoh, and the northern end of Jalan Tuanku Abdul Rahman. The monorail line continues down Jalan Tuanku Abdul Rahman until the Sultan Ismail turnoff, turning toward the east.

The station has only two exits: One at the west side of the north end of the Jalan Tuanku Abdul Rahman, and the other on the eastern turnoff to Jalan Raja Muda.

Landmarks within the vicinity
Hospital Kuala Lumpur is close to this station.

See also
 List of rail transit stations in Klang Valley

Kuala Lumpur Monorail stations
Railway stations opened in 2003